Charles Oliver Mules (8 September 1837, Ilminster – 9 October 1927, Nelson, New Zealand) was the third Anglican Bishop of Nelson, whose Episcopate spanned a 20-year period during the late 19th and early 20th centuries.

He was educated at Cheltenham College and Trinity College, Cambridge, and ordained in 1864. After a curacy at Whorlton, County Durham he emigrated to New Zealand to work under Andrew Suter, Anglican Bishop of Nelson. He was Vicar of Brightwater then  Archdeacon of Waimea before succeeding Suter. At some point he became a Doctor of Divinity.

After resigning his see he lived at Trafalgar Square in the city until his death on 9 October 1927. He is buried at St Michael's, Waimea West.

References

1837 births
People educated at Cheltenham College
Alumni of Trinity College, Cambridge
Archdeacons of Waimea
Anglican bishops of Nelson
19th-century Anglican bishops in New Zealand
20th-century Anglican bishops in New Zealand
1927 deaths